The Biblia Hebraica Quinta Editione, abbreviated as BHQ or rarely BH5, is the fifth edition of the Biblia Hebraica and when complete will supersede the fourth edition, the Biblia Hebraica Stuttgartensia (BHS).

BHQ Fascicles and Editors

The edition has been described as "international and ecumenical" as it features editors from 13 different countries and different denominations (with involvement from Catholics, Protestants and Jews). The work is currently being published in fascicles according to this release schedule:

Consulting work for the Masorah is being done by Aron Dotan, Tel Aviv University, .

 The first fascicle (general introduction and The Five Megilloth, part 18) was published in 2004.  The books are in the same order as in the Leningrad Codex and BHS, namely Ruth, Canticles (Song of Songs), Qoheleth (Ecclesiastes), Lamentations and Esther.
 The second fascicle (Ezra and Nehemiah, part 20) was published in 2006.
 The third fascicle (Deuteronomy, part 5) was published in September 2007.
 The fourth fascicle (Proverbs, part 17) was published in February 2009.
 The fifth fascicle (The Twelve Minor Prophets, part 13) was published in November 2010.
 The sixth fascicle (Judges, part 7) was published in March 2012.
 The seventh fascicle (Genesis, part 1) was published on February 1, 2016.
In October 2016, the release dates for Leviticus and Ezekiel slipped a year (from 2016 to 2017 and from 2017 to 2018, respectively) on the Scholarly-Bibles.com web page, and the release date for Numbers changed from "forthcoming in 2017" to "in preparation," and that for Job changed from "in preparation" to "forthcoming in 2017."

As of 24 April 2017, Amazon.de shows a projected release date for the Job fascicle of December 2017 with a price of 81.96 Euros and still has a different version of the same book slated for a release on 15 November 2016 at a price of 49 Euros, though the product is not yet available. Amazon.co.uk also lists the Job fascicle as forthcoming, though with a projected release date of 30 January 2018 at a price of UKP 85.63 and still has a different version of the same book slated to come out 1 May 2017 with no price stated.  It now appears that neither the fascicle for Job and nor that for Leviticus are likely to come out in 2017. (Neither amazon.de nor amazon.co.uk has a listing for the Leviticus or Ezekiel or Numbers fascicles.)

As of 2 June 2017, Amazon.com shows a projected release date for the Job fascicle of December 2017 and a price of USD 69.37.

In March 2018, the release dates for Leviticus and Ezekiel slipped another year or two (from 2018 to 2019 and from 2018 to 2020, respectively) on the Academic-Bible.com web page, and the release date for Job was changed from "forthcoming in 2017" to "forthcoming in 2019."

As of September 2022, the expected release date for Job is 2023 and for Ezekiel is 2024, according to the German Bible Society's "Academic Bibles" web page https://www.academic-bible.com/en/bible-society-and-biblical-studies/current-projects/biblia-hebraica-quinta-bhq/

Release Date

The Eisenbrauns web page estimates that the entire Hebrew Bible will be completed by 2020.  The German Bible Society makes the same prediction on web pages for the fascicles of the Twelve Minor Prophets and of Proverbs, though the German Bible Society web pages for some of the earlier fascicles still predict 2015. At the moment the endmost date on the release table says 2017, with other dates still unknown.

See also
Biblia Hebraica Stuttgartensia
Oxford Hebrew Bible
Hebrew University Bible
Hebrew Old Testament Text Project

Notes

References

External links
Richard D. Weis, "Biblia Hebraica Quinta and the Making of Critical Editions of the Hebrew Bible", TC: A Journal of Biblical Textual Criticism 2002 (including sample pages showing edition, apparatuses, and textual commentary for Jeremiah 23:1-9)
James A. Sanders, review of the BHQ edition of the Megilloth, Review of Biblical Literature 2005
(German) Deutsche Bibelgesellschaft,  Wissenschaftliche Bibelausgaben / Urtexte Altes Testament / Hebräisch

Upcoming books
Bible versions and translations
Hebrew Bible versions and translations